Part III is the third studio album by American R&B group 112. It was released by Bad Boy Records on March 20, 2001 in the United States. Unlike the previous releases, the album is described as having edgier, techno-flavored jams, resulting in a more modern and forward-sounding effort. 112 worked with musicians Anthony Dent, R. Kelly, Tim & Bob, Mario Winans, and Bad Boy head Sean Combs on the album, with band member Daron Jones helming production on the majority of Part III. The album was the group's last album with Arista Records.

Upon its release, Part III received mixed reviews from music critics, who praised the groups edgier performance, and described the album as one of the most varied and truly captivating albums that the R&B world has seen in a long time. The album debuted at number two on the US Billboard 200 chart, in the United States and was certified Platinum by the RIAA. The album produced three singles including "It's Over Now", "Dance With Me" and the smash hit, "Peaches & Cream" the latter of which was nominated for a Grammy Award.

Singles
The first single was "It's Over Now" peaking at number one on the U.S. R&B chart for two weeks. The song's beat is an alternate version of the beat from rap group Mobb Deep's 1999 single, "Quiet Storm". Elsewhere, it peaked at number twenty-two on the UK Singles Chart, their first top 40 hit there.
The second single, "Peaches and Cream" peaked at number two on the Billboard Hot R&B/Hip-Hop Songs chart and number four on the Billboard Hot 100, staying in the Top 40 for 25 weeks and making it their highest-charting Hot 100 single to date. It also topped the Billboard Rhythmic Top 40 chart. The song charted at number 32 on the UK Singles Chart on 8 September 2001. The song was nominated for Best R&B Performance by a Duo or Group with Vocal at the 44th Grammy Awards in 2002.
Dance With Me was the third and final single peaking at number 39 on the Billboard Hot 100. Elsewhere, in Australia, reaching number two on the country's ARIA Charts in April 2002 and registering as the 28th biggest song of the year. The released version featured American rapper, Beanie Sigel.

Critical reception

Part III received mixed to positive reviews from most music critics. Kris Ex of Rolling Stone magazine, noted "Puff Daddy continues to brand his soul acts with everything B.I.G. Here, the slain rapper's "Dead Wrong" serves as intro music; there, a vocal snippet from his "Who Shot Ya" punctuates the R&B quartet's "Dance With Me". But this album doesn't need B.I.G. to bump - the jittery, futuristic "Dance" bounces like something Judy Jetson would jam to when George isn't around, the prurient "Peaches and Cream" thumps hard with synth rattles and a thug worthy groove. The ballads - "Player," "Sweet Love," "Do What You Gotta Do" - drip with sweetness, but not at the expense of cool self-awareness. Produced largely by group member Daron Jones, Part III sounds as if 112 have come to terms with lacking the all-out star power of the boy bands or the uber sentimentality of glory-years Boyz II Men. Enter exhibit Part III: proof positive that Puffy's artists pack dance floors and hit the charts with bullets. We mean the right kind of bullets." Jose F. Promis of Allmusic mentions in his review, "112 have proven themselves as one of the most successful and enduring acts to emerge from the 1990s urban music explosion, and continue to prove their longevity on their third set, Part III. Their second album, Room 112, despite the hits "Love Me" and "Anywhere," failed to hint at any artistic progress for the group, but the third effort is a different story. A lot of the sappy ballads that impaired their previous outings are abandoned in favor of edgier, techno-flavored jams, resulting in a more modern and forward-sounding effort. The album's first single, "It's Over Now," is an aching slice of melodrama that proved to be the group's biggest hit to date, and one of the best singles of the year. Other cuts on the album pick up where that one left off, utilizing cutting beats and electronic sounds, such as the album's dance-flavored opener "Dance With Me," the second single "Peaches & Cream," and "All I Want Is You," which is augmented with rock guitars to fine effect. And as always, the group's vocals are nothing short of stellar. Despite some clichéd lyrics (case in point -- "Don't Hate Me") and sagging ballads toward the middle of the album (although the ballad "Missing You" is a well-crafted slice of true soul), this set is definitely a step in the right direction for a hard-working group one can happily classify as having evolved."

Felicia A. Wilks of Amazon.com, noted "Since New Edition and Boyz II Men ceded their R&B group throne of the '80s and early '90s, it's been hard to keep up with the myriad groups that have tried to take their place. But Bad Boy's resident gentlemen, 112, have always stood out from the crowd. Their latest release, Part III, further solidifies the group's appeal. On "It's Over Now," the album's first single, the group does what they do best: combining impressive vocals with Bad Boy's trademark hip-hop production. Likewise, on "Dance with Me," an intricately produced song with an infectious heartbeat bass line, the group reminds listeners that their singing ability is in a league of its own. Part III is not without its shortcomings, however. Songs like "I Think" and "Player," two monotonous attempts at romantic ballads, could have been deleted from the album without being missed. To the group's credit, however, Part III is one of the most varied and truly captivating albums that the R&B world has seen in a long time. From beautiful harmonizing to upbeat party pleasers, Part III places the four members of 112 up there with the legends of their genre."

Commercial performance
Part III debuted at number two on the US Billboard 200 and number one on the US Top R&B/Hip-Hop Albums chart, selling 182,300 copies in its first week, behind Shaggy's Hot Shot. This is the group's first top-ten album. In its second week, the album dropped to number four on the chart, selling an additional 99,583 copies. On May 16, 2001, the album was certified platinum by the Recording Industry Association of America (RIAA) for sales of over a million copies in the United States.

Track listing

Personnel

 Mark Allen – design
 Wayne Allison – recorder
 Chris Athens – mastering
 Roger Che – recorder
 Tom Coyne – mastering
 Stephen Danelian – photography
 Tim Kelley – producer, arranger, engineer, mixing, instrumentation
 Bob Robinson – producer, arranger, instrumentation
 Anthony Dent – producer
 Diddy – producer, executive producer
 DJ Scratch – scratching
 DJ Wiz – scratching
 Jan Fairchild – mixing
 Andy Haller – recorder
 Daron Jones – vocals, producer, executive producer, instrumentation
 R. Kelly – arranger, producer
 Paul Logus – mixing
 Tom Martin – guitar
 Marvin – vocals
 Tony Maserati – mixing
 Ian Mereness – recorder
 Mike – vocals, executive producer
 Rob Paustian – recorder, mixing
 Harve Pierre – associate executive producer
 Q – vocals
 Brian Smith – recorder, mixing
 Twista – performer
 Kevin Wales – executive producer

Charts

Weekly charts

Year-end charts

Certifications

Release history

See also
 List of Billboard number-one R&B albums of 2001

References

2001 albums
112 (band) albums
Bad Boy Records albums
RCA Records albums
Albums produced by Tim & Bob
Albums produced by R. Kelly